The 1976 Firecracker 400 was a NASCAR Winston Cup Series race that took place on July 4, 1976, at Daytona International Speedway in Daytona Beach, Florida. Ticket prices for this race ranged from $8 ($ when adjusted for inflation) to $30 ($ when adjusted for inflation).

Race report
There were 40 drivers on the grid; all were American-born males except for Janet Guthrie. Buddy Arrington was first out due to ignition troubles before the start of the first lap out of the 160 laps.

Cale Yarborough defeated David Pearson by eight seconds in front of an audience of 40,000 people. Two cautions (for 14 laps) and 41 different lead changes made the race two hours and twenty-nine minutes long. The green flag was waved at 10:00 A.M.

The winner of the race received $22,215 ($ when adjusted for inflation) while the last place finisher went home with $1,310 ($ when adjusted for inflation). Notable crew chiefs for this race included Billy Hagan, Junie Donlavey, Buddy Parrott, Jake Elder, Harry Hyde, Dale Inman, Bud Moore, Sterling Marlin, Herb Nab and Tim Brewer.

The race was run on America's 200th birthday and was the site of Dick Skillen's best career finish of 17th. This race was the first career finish for Bill Elliott.

Buck and Buddy Baker both exited the race on lap 32, as the 57-year-old elder champion made his final Daytona start.

Qualifying

Failed to qualify:  Sam Sommers (#27) and Jerry Mabie (#34)

Finishing order

Standings after the race

References

Firecracker 400
NASCAR races at Daytona International Speedway
Firecracker 400